Military Highway is a Tide Light Rail station in Norfolk, Virginia, USA. It opened in August 2011, and is situated along Military Highway. It is adjacent to a park and ride and connects with several bus routes.

References

External links 
Hampton Roads Transit

Tide Light Rail stations
Railway stations in the United States opened in 2011
2011 establishments in Virginia